Andrea Ramírez (born 4 September 1998) is a Colombian taekwondo practitioner. She won one of the bronze medals in the women's finweight event at the 2017 World Taekwondo Championships held in Muju, South Korea.

In 2019, she won one of the bronze medals in the women's 49kg event at the Pan American Games held in Lima, Peru. In 2020, she qualified at the Pan American Taekwondo Qualification Tournament to compete at the 2020 Summer Olympics in Tokyo, Japan. She competed in the women's 49kg event.

References

External links 
 

Living people
1998 births
Colombian female taekwondo practitioners
Competitors at the 2018 Central American and Caribbean Games
Central American and Caribbean Games gold medalists for Colombia
Central American and Caribbean Games medalists in taekwondo
Pan American Games medalists in taekwondo
Pan American Games bronze medalists for Colombia
Medalists at the 2019 Pan American Games
Taekwondo practitioners at the 2019 Pan American Games
World Taekwondo Championships medalists
Taekwondo practitioners at the 2020 Summer Olympics
Olympic taekwondo practitioners of Colombia
People from Sogamoso
Sportspeople from Boyacá Department
21st-century Colombian women
Competitors at the 2022 South American Games
South American Games medalists in taekwondo
South American Games gold medalists for Colombia